Kashmiria is a genus of flowering plants belonging to the family Plantaginaceae.

Its native range is Western Himalaya.

Species:
 Kashmiria himalaica (Hook.f.) D.Y.Hong

References

Plantaginaceae
Plantaginaceae genera